Riphean may refer to 
Riphean Mountains, mentioned by authors of classical antiquity
Ural Mountains, believed by some to be the Riphean mountains
Riphean (stage), a stage in the geological timescale named after the Urals